Dr. John Lewis House is a house in St. Matthews, Kentucky.  It was listed on the National Register of Historic Places in 1984.

It was a residence and medical offices for Dr. John Lewis.  It was deemed notable as "the only surviving nineteenth-century building in this prominent location along Westport Road - an area of twentieth-century commercial development."

References

National Register of Historic Places in Jefferson County, Kentucky
Houses completed in 1838
Houses in Jefferson County, Kentucky
Houses on the National Register of Historic Places in Kentucky
19th-century buildings and structures in Louisville, Kentucky
1838 establishments in Kentucky
St. Matthews, Kentucky